Peter B. Crombie (born June 26, 1952) is an American film and television actor.

Life and career
He appeared in such films as Born on the Fourth of July, Natural Born Killers, Seven, My Dog Skip and The Doors. His best-known television role was as the recurring minor character "Crazy" Joe Davola on Seinfeld. The name was used with the consent of Fox TV executive, Joe "Lennard" Davola. 

He also made guest appearances on such television series as Spenser: For Hire, Star Trek: Deep Space Nine (in the episode "Melora"), Walker, Texas Ranger, Law & Order, Picket Fences, NYPD Blue and many others.

Crombie wrote the script for the 2006 short drama Threshold.

He should not be confused with Peter Crombie (born December 25, 1944), an Australian Masters athlete.

References

External links
 

1952 births
American male film actors
American male television actors
Living people
Place of birth missing (living people)
20th-century American male actors